Rodrigo Daniel Marangoni (born February 21, 1978 in Paraná, Entre Ríos Province) is an Argentine football midfielder who currently plays for Atlético Huila.

A player of good passing skills, he is also a freekick specialist.

Club career

Marangoni started his professional career in 1997 with Vélez Sársfield. The following year he was loaned to second division club Atlanta, but shortly after he returned to Vélez. In 2000, he joined Arsenal de Sarandí, but left the club after making only seven first-team appearances.

In 2001, Marangoni spent some time with Almirante Brown de Arrecifes. In 2002, he moved to Bolivia and signed for Aurora. During his spell in the Liga de Fútbol Profesional Boliviano, he became a fundamental figure for the club scoring 27 goals in 66 games. In 2003, Marangoni returned to Argentina joining Douglas Haig before transferring to Club Guillermo Brown a year later. In 2006, he relocated to Colombia, where he wore the colors of first division club Atlético Huila. His impressive displays awoke the interest of Deportes Tolima, which signed him in 2008.

References

External links
 Argentine Primera statistics 

1978 births
Living people
People from Paraná, Entre Ríos
Argentine people of Italian descent
Argentine footballers
Argentine expatriate footballers
Association football midfielders
Club de Gimnasia y Esgrima La Plata footballers
Arsenal de Sarandí footballers
Club Atlético Vélez Sarsfield footballers
Club Atlético Atlanta footballers
Club Aurora players
Atlético Huila footballers
Deportes Tolima footballers
C.D. Antofagasta footballers
Barcelona S.C. footballers
Real Cartagena footballers
Club Almirante Brown footballers
Club Atlético Douglas Haig players
Guillermo Brown footballers
Chilean Primera División players
Argentine Primera División players
Categoría Primera A players
Ecuadorian Serie A players
Argentine expatriate sportspeople in Colombia
Argentine expatriate sportspeople in Bolivia
Argentine expatriate sportspeople in Ecuador
Argentine expatriate sportspeople in Chile
Expatriate footballers in Chile
Expatriate footballers in Colombia
Expatriate footballers in Bolivia
Expatriate footballers in Ecuador
Sportspeople from Entre Ríos Province